Miss Thailand World 2019 is the 29th edition of the Miss Thailand World. Pageant will be held at The Berkeley Pratunam Hotel in Bangkok on August 3, 2019. Miss Thailand World 2018 and Miss World 2018 Runner-Up Nicolene Pichapa Limsnukan of Bangkok crowned Narintorn Chadapattarawalrachoat of Pathum Thani at the end of the event. Narintorn will represent Thailand at Miss World 2019 in London.

Final results 

§ Placed into the Top 12 by Fast Track

Special Awards

Fast Track

Miss Beauty of Sea Sand Sun

Miss Fashionista by Purra

Beauty With A Purpose

Head-to-head Challenge

Sport

Talent

People's Choice

Delegates 
24 contestants will compete for the title. The information from Miss Thailand World Official website.

Crossovers and returnees 
Contestants who previously competed in previous editions of Miss Thailand World and other local and international beauty pageants with their respective placements:

Province Pageants 
 Miss Chiang Mai
 2019: Kanjarat Tantiritiporn (1st Runner-up)

 Miss Grand Chachoengsao
 2018: Phatcharalai Corvino (Winner)
 Miss Grand Phra Nakhon Si Ayutthaya
 2018: Sisawan Sukeewat (1st Runner-up)
 Miss Grand Phetchaburi
 2019: Sisawan Sukeewat (1st Runner-up)
 Miss Grand Lan Na (Chiang Rai, Phayao, Mae Hong Son, Lampang)
 2016: Kanjarat Tantiritiporn (Winner:Miss Grand Mae Hong Son)
 Miss Grand Samut Sakhon
 2018: Nongnaphat Phongsri (Winner)
 Miss Grand Uttaradit
 2020: Sisawan Sukeewat (Winner)

National Pageants 

 Miss Thailand
 2016: Lukkanawal Pradubkaew
 2019: Pornnatcha Arayasatjapong (Runner-up)
 2020: Juthamanee Parasing (Top 10)
 2020: Phamolchanok Dhilokratchatasakul 
 2020: Preeyada Buasombun (Top 16)

 Miss Universe Thailand
 2017: Juthamanee Parasing
 2017: Wanchareeporn Boontan
 2018: Papatsorn Jaruakkarapat
 2019: Chawanluck Unger (Top 10)
 2019: Dooangduan Collins
 2019: Pumirad Pingkarawat

 Miss Thailand World
 2012: Chawanluck Unger (2nd Runner-up)
 2016: Juthamanee Parasing (Top 10)

 Miss International Thailand
 2016: Juthamanee Parasing

 Miss Grand Thailand
 2016: Kanjarat Tantiritiporn
 2018: Phatcharalai Corvino (Top 12)
 2018: Nongnaphat Phongsri
 2020: Sisawan Sukeewat (Top 10)

Miss Tourism Queen Thailand
 2017: Papatsorn Jaruakkarapat

Miss All Nations Thailand
 2017: Papatsorn Jaruakkarapat

Miss Model Thailand
 2017: Wanchareeporn Boontun (3rd Runner-Up)

Elite Model Look Thailand
 2017: Kanokphan Amornmetakij

 Miss Thinn Thai Ngarm
 2018: Phamolchanok Dhilokratchatasakul (Winner)

Miss Motor Show
 2019: Juthamanee Parasing (4th Runner-up)

Gossip Star
 2016: Juthamanee Parasing (Runner-up)

International Pageants 

 Miss Global
 2019: Phamolchanok Dhilokratchatasakul (Top 11)

 Miss Tourism Queen of the Year International
 2016: Kanjarat Tantiritiporn

Miss Asia Pacific World
 2012: Chawanluck Unger (4th Runner-up)

See also
 Miss World 2019

References

External links
 

Beauty pageants in Thailand
2019 beauty pageants
2019 Thai television seasons
Miss Thailand World